Robert Emanuel Mable (1885–1960) was a pioneer rugby league footballer who played in the New South Wales Rugby League (NSWRL) competition.

Career
Mable played for the Eastern Suburbs club in the years 1908 to 1910. A forward, Mable played for New South Wales in the very first rugby match run by the newly created 'New South Wales Rugby Football League' which had just split away from the established New South Wales Rugby Football Union.

Mable was a member of the rebel sides that played against the New Zealand 'All Golds' in 1907, and was later awarded life membership in the New South Wales Rugby League for the role that he played in the series that was instrumental in the birth of rugby league in Australia. He played in Sydney's Eastern Suburbs club's first match and the NSWRL's first premiership decider.

Mable was awarded Life Membership of the New South Wales Rugby League in 1914 for his early participation in the game's inception in Australia. He is also recognized as the 8th player to play for Eastern Suburbs Club.

He died on 8 September 1960.

References

E. E. Christensen's yearbooks

Rugby league players from Sydney
Australian rugby union players
Australian rugby league players
New South Wales rugby league team players
Sydney Roosters players
1885 births
1960 deaths
Place of birth missing
Place of death missing